The Xinzang railway, Xinjiang–Xizang railway, or Xinjiang–Tibet railway, is a proposed railway that connects Hotan, Xinjiang and Xigazê, Tibet. It is one of three planned railways to Tibet in the Mid-to-Long Term Railway Network Plan (revised in 2008), the other two are Chuanzang railway (Sichuan–Tibet) and Dianzang railway (Yunnan–Tibet).

References 

Rail transport in Tibet
Rail transport in Xinjiang
Mountain railways
Railway lines in China